Liber Cure Cocorum is an English cookbook dating from around the year 1430 and originating from County of Lancashire. Unusually for a cookbook, the recipes are written in rhyming verse.

Text
It was first printed from a transcript made by Richard Morris in 1862 from a text in the Sloane Manuscript Collection (No.1986, British Museum, now British Library), found as an appendix to the "Boke of Curtasye". It is written in a northern English dialect of the 15th century, probably not much earlier than the time of Henry VI. The author titles his work "The Slyghtes of Cure", or, in modern English, "The Art of Cookery".

Content
The poem treats a great variety of dishes under the headings of potages, broths, roasted meats, baked meats, sauces and 'petecure', including the earliest references to several dishes, including haggis and humble pie.

Sample recipe
An example:
Lamprayes in browet.
Take lamprayes and scalde hom by kynde,
Sythyn, rost hom on gredyl, and grynde
Peper and safrone; welle hit with alle,
Do þo lampreyes and serve hit in sale.

or, in modern English:
Lampreys in broth.
Take lampreys and scald them by kind,
then, roast them on a griddle and grind
pepper and saffron; boil it with oil,
add the lampreys and serve it in the hall.

References

External links
 Liber Cure Cocorum Online Text, with modern translation, Published for the Philological Society by A. Asher & Co., Berlin 1862
 Online text --- By Morris, Richard, ed., 1833-1894; Philological Society (Great Britain)  Published 1862
 Liber Cure Cocorum PDF - By Morris, Richard, revised edition

References 
1430s books
Medieval cookbooks